The Premio Azorín de Novela (Azorín Prize for Best Novel) is one of the most important literary awards for works written in the Spanish language. It was originally created by Spain's Ministry of Information and Tourism in 1970. The modern form of the award was created in 1994, by the Spanish provincial government (diputación) of Alicante together with Editorial Planeta (Planeta Publishing House).

The prize honors one of the finest Spanish writers of the so-called "Generation of 98", José Augusto Trinidad Martínez Ruíz (1873-1967), who used to sign his works under the pseudonym of Azorín.
 
The prize is given annually to a non-published and original novel, whose author receives 68.000 € (some 93.000 dollars). As part of the prize, Planeta publishes the awarded novel.

List of winners

References

External links
 Azorín Award at Editorial Planeta 

Spanish literary awards
Awards established in 1994
Planeta literary awards
1994 establishments in Spain
Planeta Group